Sainte-Claire is a village in the Bellechasse Regional County Municipality, part of the Chaudière-Appalaches administrative region of Quebec, Canada. It has a population of 3,243. It is the third biggest municipality in the RCM, after Saint-Henri and Saint-Anselme. The Etchemin River goes through the village. Prévost Car, one of the biggest manufacturers of commercial buses in North America, and founded by one of Sainte-Claire's native sons, Eugène Prévost, is located in the village, and is by far the biggest employer in the region.

References

Municipalities in Quebec
Incorporated places in Chaudière-Appalaches